Timothy William Fornara is a British producer/director now based in New York.

Biography 

Fornara has credits on several albums including debut artist Laura Critchley. In 2005 he was Colin Farrell's photo double for the Oliver Stone film Alexander and has also appeared in the teen movie What a Girl Wants and children's TV series The One.

In 1997, he was chosen to succeed Schelim Hannan in the British boyband Worlds Apart. In July 2000, Fornara left the band to create another, Withmey and Fornara, later renamed as The Blue Print before becoming The Setup Productions. He enjoyed success writing songs for country artist Laura Critchley and the band Kojo.

In 2006 Fornara began a successful hosting Career in the U.K working for Sky TV, BBC and  becoming the face of Film 24, before stepping behind the camera to produce and direct content.

The players did meet Pelé. After that Fornara relocated to New York and has since made shows including for Would You Rather starring  Graham Norton for BBC America, a brand new series for MTV out this winter and the Film insider series for  Plum TV, which he also hosted. He also produced the official YouTube Channel  Spacelab which has 58 million views worldwide and 100,000 subscribers. Fornara  is currently developing a new comedy web series and will make a second season of  Style setters for Tresemmé in the fall.

References 
Notes

Sources
 Danny Harris – Generate
 Jim Biederman – Jimco Productions
 Kathleen Grace – YouTube

1977 births
British television producers
British expatriates in the United States
Living people
Worlds Apart (band) members
British television presenters